Persatuan Sepakbola Aceh Singkil (simply known as PSAS) is an Indonesian football club based in Aceh Singkil Regency, Aceh. They currently compete in the Liga 3.

References

Football clubs in Indonesia
Football clubs in Aceh